Local elections were held in the United Kingdom in May 1981. The results were a mid-term setback for the Conservative government, which lost 1,193 seats, leaving them with 10,545 councillors.  The projected share of the vote was more respectable for the government, however: Labour 41%, Conservatives 38%, Liberals 17%. This was in spite of opinion polls showing a much wider Labour lead over the Conservatives. These were the first elections to be contested by Labour under the leadership of Michael Foot, who had succeeded James Callaghan in late 1980.

Elections took place for the county councils and the Greater London Council, which elected 50 Labour councillors, 41 Conservatives and 1 Liberal.

In terms of the county councils, changes in party control were as follows;

Labour gain from Conservative: Cumbria, Derbyshire, Lancashire, Nottinghamshire, Staffordshire

Labour gain from no overall control: Northumberland

Conservative lose to no overall control: Bedfordshire, Gloucestershire, Leicestershire, Northamptonshire, Warwickshire

Liberal gain from Conservative: Isle of Wight

Labour gained 988 overall seats, bringing their number of councillors to 8,999.  This was the first electoral test for Labour leader Michael Foot, who had become Labour leader in November 1980.

The Liberal Party gained 306 seats and finished with 1,455 councillors.  The 1981 local elections were to be the last to be held before the Liberals formed an alliance with the new Social Democratic Party (SDP) in June 1981.

Summary of results

England

Unicameral area
This was the last election to the council before it was abolished by the Local Government Act 1985.

Metropolitan county councils
These were the last elections to the county councils before they were abolished by the Local Government Act 1985.

Non-metropolitan county councils

‡ New electoral division boundaries

Sui generis

Northern Ireland

Wales

County councils

References

Local elections 2006. House of Commons Library Research Paper 06/26.
Vote 2001 BBC News

 
Local elections